Cold Kickin' It is a studio album released in 1990 by the Washington, D.C.-based go-go band E.U. The album is a follow up to their 1989 album Livin' Large.

Track listing

Singles

References

External links
 Cold Kickin' It at Discogs.com

1990 albums
Experience Unlimited albums
Virgin Records albums